Elakatmakhi (Dargwa: ГӀелакатмахьи) is a rural locality (a selo) in Dzhangamakhinsky Selsoviet, Levashinsky District, Republic of Dagestan, Russia. The population was 74 as of 2010. There are 3 streets.

Geography 
It is located 7 km northeast of Levashi.

Nationalities 
Dargins live there.

References 

Rural localities in Levashinsky District